Ptoseulia is a genus of moths belonging to the family Tortricidae.

Species
Ptoseulia oxyropa Razowski, 1990
Ptoseulia ozonia Razowski, 1990

See also
List of Tortricidae genera

References

 , 1992 (1990): On some peculiar Neotropical tortricine genera (Lepidoptera: Tortricidae). Shilap Revista de Lepidopterologia 18: 209–215.

External links
tortricidae.com

Euliini
Tortricidae genera